The Three Angels Broadcasting Network, or 3ABN, is a Christian media television and radio network which broadcasts Seventh-day Adventist religious and health-oriented programming, based in West Frankfort, Illinois, United States. Although it is not formally tied to any particular church or denomination, much of its programming focuses on Seventh-day Adventist theology and Adventist doctrine.

History
Three Angels Broadcasting Network is located in West Frankfort, Illinois. In July 2017, 3ABN announced the sale of 60 low-powered television (LPTV) stations and 10 LPTV construction permits to Edge Spectrum. In October 2017, 3ABN announced the sale of 14 LPTV stations to HC2 Holdings.

Programming

The stated goal of 3ABN's programming is a blend of family and social programs, health and lifestyle, gospel music, and a wide variety of Bible-based presentations.

3ABN maintains several distinct subchannels, separated by language and format.

 3ABN (the flagship service with a mixture of programs from the other subchannels)
 3ABN Proclaim! (all-televangelism)
 3ABN Latino Network (Spanish language)
 3ABN Latino Radio Network (Spanish language)
 3ABN Radio Network
 3ABN Radio Music Channel
 3ABN Russia (Russian language)
 3ABN Russia Radio Network (Russian language)
 3ABN Français Network (French language)
 3ABN International Network (partial simulcast of the main 3ABN with some foreign programming)
 3ABN Dare to Dream Network ("urban Christian lifestyle")
 3ABN Kids Network (children's programming, also covers the network's E/I liabilities)
 3ABN Praise Him Music Network (worship music)
 3ABN Australia Radio Network
 3ABN Plus (3ABN+) live streaming broadcasts of all 3ABN television and radio networks with videos on demand, and so much more, and the subscription is free

As of early 2009, 3ABN's main TV channel had 69% original programming; 3ABN Latino had 67% original programming; and 3ABN Russia had 100% original programming.

The 3ABN International network has the same/similar lineup of programs as 3ABN's flagship network.  3ABN International carries "3ABN Now", the flagship program and some other programming produced by 3ABN Australia.

Not only 3ABN produced their programming at their World Headquarters in West Frankfort, Illinois, 3ABN also produces and carries their programming in their world branches at Three Angels Russian Evangelism Centre in Nizhny Novgorod in Russia and 3ABN Australia Production Centre in Morisset, New South Wales in Australia.

Availability

3ABN television networks are available viewing worldwide through various ways and platforms like international satellites including DISH Network (United States), local downlink stations, and over-the-air stations (United States), cable television, Internet, YouTube, Facebook, 3ABN+ app with Apple and Android mobile devices, Roku, Amazon Fire TV, Smart TVs, Android TV, Apple TV (4th and 5th Generation and future), 3ABN networks are available via FaithStream (Australia), MySDATV, Interless Box by MySDATV, Verizon FiOS, Skitter TV, Truli, Transvision NetWork (France, Antilles-Guyana and Reunion), VAST Satellite (Australia), Sky Cable (Philippines), and Cignal (Philippines), and MyTVToGo (worldwide). 3ABN radio networks are available listening through local radio stations, international satellites, 3ABN+ app with Apple and Android mobile devices, Roku, Amazon Fire TV, Apple TV, Smart TVs, Android TV. 3ABN radio networks are available on MySDATV, Interless Box by MySDATV, FaithStream (Australia) FaithStream and the Internet.

See also

 Seventh-day Adventist Church
 List of Three Angels Broadcasting Network affiliates
 Three Angels' Messages

References

External links
3ABN.org
3ABN+

Three Angels Broadcasting Network
Television networks in the United States
American radio networks
Christian film production companies
Christian radio stations in Australia
Christian radio stations in the United States
Christian television networks
Gospel music media
Conservative media in the United States
Religious television stations in the United States
English-language television stations in Australia
Independent ministries of the Seventh-day Adventist Church
International broadcasters
Adventist organizations established in the 20th century
Television channels and stations established in 1984
Radio stations established in 1999
Radio broadcasting companies of the United States
Companies based in Franklin County, Illinois
1999 establishments in Illinois
Internet television streaming services
Internet television channels
Internet properties established in 2021